Masood Anwar (born 10 December 1967) is a former Pakistani cricketer who played in one Test match in 1990.

1967 births
Living people
Pakistan Test cricketers
Pakistani cricketers
Multan cricketers
Pakistan Automobiles Corporation cricketers
United Bank Limited cricketers
Faisalabad cricketers
Lahore City cricketers
South Zone (Pakistan) cricketers
Pakistani cricket coaches
Cricketers from Khanewal